Nikolichi is a rural locality (a village) in Beloyevskoye Rural Settlement, Kudymkarsky District, Perm Krai, Russia. The population was 13 as of 2010.

Geography 
Nikolichi is located 23 km northwest of Kudymkar (the district's administrative centre) by road. Brazhkina is the nearest rural locality.

References 

Rural localities in Kudymkarsky District